In December 2022, Southwest Airlines, a major U.S. airline, and the second largest by domestic passenger volume, canceled more flights than usual, including more than 60% of its flights on two days. The disruption to operations was described by Seeking Alpha as the most costly and largest in the history of U.S. airlines. More than 15,000 flights were cancelled throughout the crisis.

Background 
Starting from 0.8% in 2012, Southwest's flight cancellation rate tripled to 2.4% by 2022. The airline has also had higher cancellation rates than other major airlines. Meanwhile, their flight on time rate has slid to its lowest level in 10 years. Michael Santoro, the vice president of the Southwest Airlines Pilots Association (SWAPA) indicated that Southwest has not invested in an updated software system. There have been complaints for a decade from members of the flight attendant's union that the technology behind Southwest's scheduling system is outdated. Earlier in 2022, SWAPA campaigned Southwest not for increased pay and benefits—the traditional goals of an airline worker's union—but rather to pressure the airline to improve its crew scheduling technology. SWAPA said that the inflexibility of the airline's scheduling system was causing it to cancel many delayed flights because the crew's allowable duty hours were going to expire; the airline would then lose track of the crews, forcing them to sleep on airport floors or find hotel rooms themselves. The airline could not efficiently locate and dispatch backup crews to operate delayed flights, SWAPA said.

In June and October of 2021 Southwest suffered mass cancellation events. Southwest cancelled more than 2,000 flights during the October 2021 event, blaming a combination of weather, insufficient staff, and air traffic control. The disruption to Southwest's system was worse than in other airlines at the time. SWAPA blamed the failure on poor planning by management.

Summary and timeline
On Wednesday, December 21, the  December 2022 North American winter storm caused severe winter weather across much of the western United States, prompting many airlines to cancel many flights. In a December 21 memo to airport ramp staff at Denver International Airport (DEN), Southwest's vice president for ground operations declared a "state of operational emergency" because of an "unusually high number of absences" there, implementing mandatory overtime and disallowing telemedicine appointments to excuse absences due to sickness. The state of operational emergency was only implemented at DEN, which was subjected to unusually frigid conditions. An airline spokesperson later denied that the Denver absences were the result of a "coordinated 'job action by ramp employees there.

From Wednesday, December 21, until Sunday, December 25, 2022, Southwest cancelled around 25% of its flights. On December 26, Southwest cancelled over 50% of its trips, blaming the winter storm.  Some customers could not contact the airline nor locate their luggage. On Monday, December 26, Southwest initiated a massive systemwide "reset", preemptively canceling thousands of flights during the following week, and halting ticket sales over concerns that travelers might buy tickets for flights that are subsequently canceled; the airline said it would not allow flights to be rebooked until December 31 or later. Parents reported that, on December 26, the airline stopped allowing unaccompanied minors to travel.

By December 27, it became more clear that weather was not the sole cause of the mass cancellations; rather, the airline's operational systems were struggling to recover from the disruptions. On December 25 and 26, Southwest canceled over 5,500 flights, whereas its competitor Delta Air Lines canceled 311. It was reported that Southwest cockpit and cabin crews had been suffering extremely long delays contacting crew scheduling, with telephone hold times exceeding five hours. It was later reported that some pilots and flight attendants had gone to sleep with their phones on hold and had woken up the next morning to find that they were still on hold. On December 26, weather at DEN warmed substantially and other airlines largely resumed normal operations, yet Southwest canceled 415 flights, about 75% of its schedule there, accounting for about 90% of the total cancellations at the airport that day. That same day, Southwest canceled over 200 flights at Dallas Love Field, while Dallas Fort Worth International Airport—which is located a short distance away, handles many more flights, and is not used by Southwest—saw 31 cancellations.  

On December 28, Southwest cancelled 2,348 more flights.

On December 30, Southwest began flying most of its regular schedule.  Chief executive officer (CEO) Robert Jordan issued an apology via video recording seven days after mass cancellations began.

Throughout the crisis, a substantial number of passengers were left stranded at airports across the Southwest route network seeking alternative flights or modes of transportation, with multi-hour wait times for rental car counters a common occurrence. Passengers seeking to purchase tickets on competing carriers encountered substantial price hikes due to increased demand, before some carriers announced temporary price caps on certain routes. Many Southwest crews found themselves competing with stranded passengers for scarce hotel rooms and ground transportation, with no help from the company.

On Monday January 2, 2023, three days after Southwest airlines had declared a return to normal operations, 160 flights (3% of its flights) had been canceled, the most of any American airline, according to tracking site FlightAware. Another 422, or 10%, of its scheduled flights were delayed. The majority of disrupted flights were scheduled to fly in or out of Denver.

Cancellations and delays by day

Causes

Computer technology
Initial investigations said outdated technology was to blame and an industry analyst said it was also due to airlines "running these razor thin margins." The number of full-time tech workers at Southwest declined by 27% from 2018 to 2021 while overall full-time employment at the airline declined by just 6% over the same period. Antiquated computer infrastructure and software systems used for managing and crewing flights contributed heavily to the quantity of flight cancellations; Southwest Airlines was unable at points to locate crew members to adequately staff flights. In November of 2022, SWAPA predicted the company was "one IT router failure away from a complete meltdown." At a media event that same month, CEO Jordan mentioned that "the company's growth outstripped the tools needed", referencing the airline's switch to electronic baggage and weather reporting, a technology adopted by other airlines years prior; Southwest had been delivering the reports on paper to all of its daily flights. A representative of the Transport Workers Union of America (TWU) Local 556, the union representing Southwest's flight attendants, said that the airline's hesitance to adopt new technology had "almost became a running joke around the company".

Rather than using standard commercial scheduling software like that used by other airlines, Southwest relies on two proprietary and internally-maintained software programs, SkySolver and Crew Web Access. Although both programs are available as mobile apps, they frequently fail during even mild weather disruptions, forcing crews to telephone crew scheduling. During the crisis, telephone operators at scheduling were overwhelmed, and crews found themselves waiting on hold for hours and being assigned to flights that had already been canceled, in turn preventing them operating other flights before their duty hours expired. The airline resorted to training 1,000 additional employees to help crews on the telephone.

Route network
Unlike other large U.S. airlines which mostly use hub-and-spoke systems, Southwest uses point-to-point operations, which makes it unusually vulnerable to scheduling disruptions because its available pilots and flight attendants are not concentrated at its hubs and it cannot easily reroute passengers by sending them to the hubs. Experts attributed the crisis largely to the lack of scheduling flexibility inherent in the point-to-point operations model.

Possible lack of regulatory actions 
William J. McGee, a consumer advocate and Senior Fellow for Aviation and Travel at the American Economic Liberties Project, called the Southwest Airlines failures “inevitable” due to Department of Transportation regulatory inaction. He stated that transportation Secretary Pete Buttigieg “..has been a tremendous disappointment,” and that he “spent months appearing to regulate rather than actually regulating”. McGee is supportive of new legislation that would allow states to take action against airlines, something not possible under the 1978 Airline Deregulation Act.

Aftermath 
In a letter from Transportation Secretary Pete Buttigieg to CEO Jordan dated December 29, 2022, the Department of Transportation identified that the cancellations were not caused by weather. This places the onus of financial responsibility for the cancellations on Southwest. On January 6, 2023 Southwest issued about US$300 worth of frequent flyer points to affected customers, which must be claimed by March 31, 2023. By January 6, 2023 Southwest stock had lost 8% of its value from immediately before the crisis.

In an unofficial report released by Southwest, the losses for the 4th quarter of 2022 are expected to be US$725 million to US$825 million.

Southwest announced their intention to spend US$1.3 billion on maintenance and technology upgrades to correct the problems that caused the crisis.

Investigation 
On December 27, 2022, the United States Senate Commerce Committee promised to investigate. 

On December 28, 2022, the U.S. Department of Transportation launched a formal investigation. Meanwhile, Transportation Secretary Pete Buttigieg has criticized Southwest in various interviews.

In popular culture 
Saturday Night Live lampooned the crisis in a skit.

See also 
History of Southwest Airlines
Contract of carriage
FlyersRights.org

Reference 

December 2022 events in the United States
Southwest Airlines
Aviation accidents and incidents in the United States in 2022